The Sweet Hereafter is the soundtrack album to the 1997 Canadian film The Sweet Hereafter.

Track listing
The album contains composer Mychael Danna's score and five songs performed by actress Sarah Polley.

Background

The film makes references to The Pied Piper of Hamelin by Robert Browning, which influenced composer Mychael Danna's music. He used a Persian ney flute along with old instruments such as recorders, crumhorns and lutes, creating "a pseudo-medieval score. The ney performer is Persian music teacher Hossein Omoumi. The score thus combined Danna's interests in old and exotic music. Egoyan stated medieval-style music was used to make the film feel timeless, evoking Brothers Grimm fairy tales and avoiding the feel of a TV movie.

Polley's character, Nicole, is an aspiring singer before the accident, and is seen on stage performing the Tragically Hip's "Courage (for Hugh MacLennan)" and Jane Siberry's "One More Colour". Danna and Polley cooperated to create Nicole's music, with Polley writing lyrics to Danna's original songs and with Danna arranging the adaptations of "Courage" and "One More Colour". The songs were chosen because of their domestic popularity, reinforcing the local nature of Nicole's music. The Tragically Hip's original version of "Courage" also appears in the film.

Release
The album was released in Canada by Virgin Music Canada, selling 7,000 copies by May 1998. The album was also released by Virgin Records in the United States, United Kingdom and Europe. By October, the album had sold 25,000 copies worldwide, bringing in a profit for Virgin Records given the inexpensive production.

Reception
Gramophone magazine gave the soundtrack a positive review, writing "A dreamy piece for keyboards, as well as other delicate atmospheres, makes the viewer/listener aware of the transforming power of grief". Gramophone also stated "Polley’s plaintive, beautiful soprano voice is a real find". 

MTV wrote "the soundtrack, which also includes Polley's cover of Toronto singer-songwriter Jane Siberry's 'One More Colour,' plus an original score by Canadian composer Mychael Danna, provides positive counterbalances to the bleak images on the film".

References

Bibliography
 
 

1997 soundtrack albums
Virgin Records soundtracks
Drama film soundtracks